Phyllonorycter fitchella is a moth of the family Gracillariidae. It is known from Québec in Canada and Connecticut, Kentucky, Pennsylvania, Texas, Illinois, New York, California, Florida, Georgia, Maine, Maryland, Michigan, Vermont, Colorado and Missouri in the United States.

The wingspan is 7.5–8 mm. Adults are on wing from March to October in California.

The larvae feed on Quercus species, including Quercus alba, Quercus bicolor, Quercus castanea, Quercus ilicifolia, Quercus macrocarpa, Quercus prinoides, Quercus prinus and Quercus stellata. They mine the leaves of their host plant. The larva mines the underside of oak leaves, forming a tentiform mine, of which the loosened epidermis is slightly wrinkled at maturity. The pupa is suspended in a slight web of silk.

References

External links
Bug Guide

fitchella
Moths of North America
Moths described in 1860